Lacey Pauletta is an international footballer who currently plays for Real Rincon of the Bonaire League  and the Bonaire national football team.

International career
On 14 November 2013, Piar made his international debut for Bonaire against Suriname in the 2013 ABCS Tournament.  This match was also Bonaire's official debut after being accepted as a member of CFU and an associate member of CONCACAF in April 2013. After losing to Suriname in the semi-finals, Bonaire defeated Aruba in the 3rd place match 2-1. Pauletta opened the scoring against the FIFA side and scored the own first official goal for Bonaire after becoming a CFU member.

International goals
Scores and results list Bonaire's goal tally first.

References

1988 births
Living people
Association football forwards
Dutch Antillean footballers
Netherlands Antilles international footballers
Bonaire footballers
Bonaire international footballers
Dual internationalists (football)